Rose Hill is an unincorporated community and census-designated place (CDP) in Lee County, Virginia, United States. The population was 799 at the 2010 census, up from 714 at the 2000 census.

Geography
Rose Hill is located in western Lee County at  (36.672039, −83.370062). U.S. Route 58 passes through the north side of the community, leading east  to Jonesville, the county seat, and west  to Cumberland Gap, Tennessee. The Kentucky border is just over a mile to the northwest, on the crest of Cumberland Mountain.

The community is drained by White Branch, flowing into Martin Creek, which runs south to the Powell River in Tennessee and is part of the Tennessee River watershed.

History
The Rose Hill post office was established in 1825. The community was likely named for rose bushes growing in the area.

Martin's Station
Rose Hill was the site of Martin's Station, the westernmost frontier fort built by Indian trader and later Brigadier General Joseph Martin, namesake of Martinsville, Virginia, and one of the first explorers of the Powell Valley. After Indian raids on his Powell Valley settlement, Martin abandoned his early fort. Six years later, in early 1775, Martin returned to the region and built the fort at Martin's Station in early 1775 on the north side of Martin's Creek. The fort was abandoned the following year after conflicts between settlers and Native Americans.

Today there is a replica of the fort at nearby Wilderness Road State Park.

Demographics
As of the census of 2000, there were 714 people, 306 households, and 197 families residing in the CDP. The population density was 207.7 people per square mile (80.1/km2). There were 344 housing units at an average density of 100.1/sq mi (38.6/km2). The racial makeup of the CDP was 97.76% White, 0.98% African American, 0.14% Native American, 0.56% Asian, and 0.56% from two or more races. Hispanic or Latino of any race were 0.14% of the population.

There were 306 households, out of which 30.1% had children under the age of 18 living with them, 48.0% were married couples living together, 13.4% had a female householder with no husband present, and 35.3% were non-families. 33.0% of all households were made up of individuals, and 15.4% had someone living alone who was 65 years of age or older. The average household size was 2.33 and the average family size was 2.96.

In the CDP, the population was spread out, with 25.9% under the age of 18, 4.8% from 18 to 24, 29.6% from 25 to 44, 24.4% from 45 to 64, and 15.4% who were 65 years of age or older. The median age was 39 years. For every 100 females, there were 74.1 males. For every 100 females age 18 and over, there were 75.2 males.

The median income for a household in the CDP was $15,408, and the median income for a family was $15,833. Males had a median income of $23,500 versus $16,583 for females. The per capita income for the CDP was $9,652. About 36.4% of families and 40.8% of the population were below the poverty line, including 55.6% of those under age 18 and 35.9% of those age 65 or over.

Notable residents 
Pete DeBusk, businessman, founder of DeRoyal Industries
Frank Rowlett, cryptologist, member of the Signal Intelligence Service

References

External links

Census-designated places in Lee County, Virginia
Census-designated places in Virginia